Lisbourg  is a commune in Pas-de-Calais, Hauts-de-France, France.

Geography
Lisbourg is located at the source of Lys, which flows northwards to Belgium and the Scheldt estuary.

History
The knight, Vollant de Berneville acquired the estate of Lisbourg in 1692 and was promoted to Marquise in 1694. His family ran the estate up until the French Revolution and were the last Lords of Lisbourg.

Population

Places of interest
The remains of the castle
The War Memorial, in the graveyard of the church, commemorating the 44 that died for France in two world wars

See also
 Communes of the Pas-de-Calais department

References

Communes of Pas-de-Calais